The Roman Catholic Diocese of Obuasi is a diocese located in the city of Obuasi in the Ecclesiastical province of Kumasi in Ghana.

History
 March 3, 1995: Established as Diocese of Obuasi from the Diocese of Kumasi

Special churches
The Cathedral is Cathedral of St. Thomas in Obuasi.

Leadership
 Bishops of Obuasi (Roman rite)
 Bishop Thomas Kwaku Mensah (March 3, 1995 - March 26, 2008), appointed Archbishop of Kumasi
 Bishop Gabriel Justice Yaw Anokye (March 26, 2008 - May 15, 2012), appointed Archbishop of Kumasi
 Bishop John Yaw Afoakwa, (22 November 2014 - )

See also
Roman Catholicism in Ghana

Sources
 GCatholic.org
 Catholic Hierarchy

Roman Catholic dioceses in Ghana
Dioceses in Ghana
Christian organizations established in 1995
Roman Catholic dioceses and prelatures established in the 20th century
Roman Catholic Ecclesiastical Province of Kumasi